Stimigliano is a  (municipality) in the Province of Rieti in the Italian region of Latium, located about  north of Rome and about  southwest of Rieti.

Stimigliano borders the following municipalities: Collevecchio, Forano, Ponzano Romano, Sant'Oreste, Tarano.

Demographic evolution

References

Cities and towns in Lazio